Pärvie Fault is a large geological fault located in Northwestern Sweden. The fault is about 155 km long and is the longest known postglacial fault in the world. The fault had a major period of seismic activity following the deglaciation of Fennoscandia about 10,000 years ago. It is one of several postglacial faults in northern Sweden that remain seismically active.

References

Seismic faults of Sweden
Landforms of Norrbotten County